Santiago is one of three parishes in Sariego, a municipality within the province and autonomous community of Asturias, in northern Spain. The parish church is the Iglesia de Santiago el Mayor (Sariego).

Villages and hamlets
 Berros
 La Carcavá
 La Cuesta
 Llamasanti
 Moral
 Ñora
 Pedrosa
 El Rebollal
 Santianes
 La Vega

Parishes in Sariego